A list of existing and former windmills whose sites fall within Greater London, England. When built, these mills were within the counties of Kent, Surrey, Middlesex, Hertfordshire or Essex. Of those windmills known to have existed, nine remain and are preserved; as are the tide mills at Three Mills, West Ham.

Locations

A - B

C - D

E - F

G -H

I - L

M - P

R - S

T - W

Maps

c.1563 "Woodcut" (or "Agas") map of London
1610 John Speed
1616 John Visscher
1626 
1635 Moses Glover (Map of the Isleworth Hundred)
1647 Wenceslas Hollar (Long View of London from Bankside)
1648 John Norden
1658 William Faithorne
1659 William Faithorne
1660 Frederick De Wit
1666 Ben Gerlen
1673 Richard Blome
1675 John Ogilby
1678 John Ogilby & William Morgan
1695 Robert Morden
1695*Robert Morden
1696 Robert Morden
1700 Robert Morden & John Pask
1700*
1703 Joel Gascoigne (survey of the Parish of Stepney)
1720 Dr Harris
1723 Sutton Nicholl (A prospect of Greenwich & London)
1724 Sutton Nicholl (View of London and Southwark)
1724* John Warburton, Joseph Bland & Payler Smith
1729 John Sennex
1731 C du Box (A view of Greenwich)
1733 John Seller
1736 Emanuel Bowen
1742 John Seller
1746 John Rocque
1746* John Rocque
1753 Emanuel Bowen
1754 John Rocque
1762 John Rocque
1763 John Rocque
1769 Andrews, Dury and Herbert
1777 John Chapman and Peter André
1777*Andrews & Dury
1789 Lindley & Crosley
1790 William Faden
1800 Laurie & Whittle
1816 Ordnance Survey
1818 Christopher & John Greenwood
1819 Ordnance Survey
1830 Ordnance Survey
1823 Bryant
1824 Christopher Greenwood (Map of London)
1825 Christopher Greenwood
1832 Cary (Map of Deptford)
1843 Ordnance Survey
1844 Ordnance Survey
1850 C Knight
1863 Ordnance Survey
1893 Ordnance Survey
1903 Ordnance Survey

Notes

Mills in bold are still standing, known building dates are indicated in bold. Text in italics denotes indicates that the information is not confirmed, but is likely to be the case stated.

Bexleyheath
May Place Mill, listed in Watermills and Windmills under Bexleyheath, actually stood just within Crayford, and has an entry at the List of windmills in Kent.

Finsbury Fields
The last of the Finsbury Fields windmills was demolished c. 1750 to make way for St Luke's Hospital for the Clergy.

Millwall
Three mills were standing in 1835, two in 1845. The last mill standing was the smock mill, as detailed above.

Sources

References

 
London
Windmills